The Wolf of the Sila (Italian: Il lupo della Sila) is a 1949 Italian drama film directed by Duilio Coletti and starring Silvana Mangano, Amedeo Nazzari and Vittorio Gassman. Much of the film was shot on location around La Sila in Calabria.

Synopsis
After the death of her brother at the hands of the police, a young woman takes her revenge on the two men she believes to have been responsible.

Cast
 Silvana Mangano as Rosaria Campolo  
 Amedeo Nazzari as Rocco Barra  
 Vittorio Gassman as Pietro Campolo  
 Jacques Sernas as Salvatore Barra  
 Luisa Rossi as Orsola Barra  
 Olga Solbelli as La madre di Rosaria  
 Dante Maggio as Gennaro  
 Michele Capezzuoli as Salvatore da bambino  
 Laura Cortese as Rosaria da bambina 
 Attilio Dottesio as Un contadino  
 Rudy Randi as Contadino

References

Bibliography 
 Forgacs, David & Gundle, Stephen. Mass Culture and Italian Society from Fascism to the Cold War. Indiana University Press, 2007.

External links 
 

1949 films
Italian drama films
Italian black-and-white films
1949 drama films
1940s Italian-language films
Films directed by Duilio Coletti
Films set in Calabria
Films produced by Dino De Laurentiis
Lux Film films
Films scored by Enzo Masetti
1940s Italian films
Films shot in Calabria